Blues' Blues is an album by American trumpeter Blue Mitchell recorded in 1972 and released on the Mainstream label.

Reception
The Allmusic review by Scott Yanow awarded the album 2½ stars stating "the music overall is listenable and funky, but not particularly memorable. Just an average date from these fine musicians".

Track listing
All compositions by Blue Mitchell except as indicated
 "Casa Blues" (John Guerin) - 8:25   
 "Just Made Up" (Joe Sample) - 7:32   
 "Blues' Blues" - 7:05   
 "Granite & Concrete" (Hadley Caliman) - 9:51   
 "I Didn't Ask To Be" (George Bohanon) - 10:09  
 "Valerie" (Walter Bishop, Jr.) - 12:26 Bonus track on CD reissue 
Recorded in Los Angeles, California in 1972.

Personnel
Blue Mitchell - trumpet, flugelhorn
John Mayall - harmonica
Herman Riley - flute, tenor saxophone
Freddy Robinson - guitar
Joe Sample - piano, electric piano
Darrell Clayborn - electric bass
John Guerin - drums

References

Mainstream Records albums
Blue Mitchell albums
1972 albums
Albums produced by Bob Shad